Bangladesh Machine Tools Factory Limited (BMTF) is a commercial automobile assembly plant of the Bangladesh Army. It mainly engaged to build and modify automobiles specially for defence industry. It is located at Gazipur, about 40 km from Dhaka.

History 
Bangladesh Machine Tools Factory Limited was established in 1967. After the independence of Bangladesh, the factory started renewed operations on 11 February 1979 as a state owned company. In 1996, the factory was closed due to poor financial performance. On 27 July 2000, Prime Minister Sheikh Hasina handed over the closed factory to Bangladesh Army who restarted it under the Bangladesh Machine Tools Factory name.

On 28 February 2005, Bangladesh Machine Tools Factory Limited signed an agreement with Pacific Motors Limited to assemble Nissan branded cars at the factory. They will be assisted by Nissan Diesel Motor Company Limited. The factory announced it had made a profit of 60.3 million taka in February 2005.

Bangladesh Machine Tools Factory started manufacturing shoes in August 2007 and was inaugurated by Moeen U Ahmed, Chief of Army Staff of the Bangladesh Army. The factory manufactures military boots, sneakers, and formal shoes.

The government of Bangladesh awarded a contract to Bangladesh Machine Tools Factory Limited to supply Radio Frequency Identification (RFID) tags and special plates for Bangladesh Road Transport Authority in 2009 and made it mandatory for all cars to have them. The six billion taka contract was given without a competitive tender process. The government choose RFID tags rather than GPS because they perceived GPS to be more expensive. The Daily Star described the RFID tags as "less effective, time-consuming and costly". The work was subcontracted to an American company which manufactured the plates in Poland. In 2014, there were only 12 RFID scanners in Bangladesh and all of them were in Dhaka for the 2.1 million tags in usage.

In October 2011, Bangladesh Machine Tools Factory started manufacturing light bulbs and LED lights. Bangladesh Machine Tools Factory Limited unveiled a car lift system that it had developed in collaboration with Daiei, a Japanese firm. The development was announced by Major General Anup Kumar Chakma, Master-General of the Ordnance. Bangladesh Machine Tools Factory Limited manufactured Electronic Voting Machine (EVM) in collaboration with Bangladesh University of Engineering and Technology for Bangladesh Election Commission. The project was supervised by Professor Jamilur Reza Choudhury.

Bangladesh Machine Tools Factory Limited manufactured two vans for Bangladesh Jail. The vans were equipped with online surveillance system were handed over to the prison authorities on 30 January 2017. In October 2017, Bangladesh Machine Tools Factory Limited and Bangladesh Election Commission decided to jointly implement a 16 billion taka project to create smart national ID cards.

In 2017, Bangladesh Machine Tools Factory supplied electronic voting machine for elections in Rangpur City Corporation. Bangladesh Election Commission was satisfied with the new design and order 2500 more units for the 2018 Bangladeshi general election. They would buy 150 thousand electronic voting machine from Bangladesh Machine Tools Factory for the election with a total cost of 40 billion taka.

In September 2018, Bangladesh Machine Tools Factory established a furniture manufacturing unit called BMTF Furniture. On 12 September 2018, the Cabinet Committee on Government Purchase approved a contract to buy shotguns and shells worth 1.47 billion taka for Bangladesh Ansar and Village Defence Party to Bangladesh Machine Tools Factory.

Bangladesh Machine Tools Factory started construction on three model villages through a 1.54 billion taka project in October 2019. The model villages are located in Rangpur District, Gopalganj District, and Bogura District. The project was retroactively approved by the Cabinet Committee on Economic Affairs.

Bangladesh Machine Tools Factory Limited also produces products for civilian use. It produced Germnil hand sanitizer during the COVID-19 pandemic in Bangladesh. It also donated to the Prime Minister's Relief and Welfare Fund to help those affected by the pandemic. In February 2020, Bangladesh Road Transport Authority cancelled a contract for 400 thousand license plates and choose to buy them from Bangladesh Machine Tools Factory Limited. In April 2020, Bangladesh Machine Tools Factory announced that it will create ventilators of the COVID-19 pandemic with technical support from Massachusetts Institute of Technology.

Mohammad Abdur Razzaque, Minister of Agriculture, urged Bangladesh Machine Tools Factory Limited to produce more farm equipments as part of the government's effort to mechanize farming in Bangladesh.

On 17 September 2020, the Cabinet of Bangladesh approved a proposal by Bangladesh Rural Electrification Board to buy 1.64 billion taka worth of electric poles from Bangladesh Machine Tools Factory Limited. Cabinet Committee on Economic Affairs approved a proposal by Bangladesh Rural Electrification Board to buy 323 million taka worth of electric poles from Bangladesh Machine Tools Factory on 27 January 2021.

See also
 Bangladesh Ordnance Factories
 Pragoti
 List of companies of Bangladesh
 Defence industry of Bangladesh

References

External links
 Official Website of Bangladesh Machine Tools Factory

Manufacturing companies of Bangladesh
Defence companies of Bangladesh
Manufacturing companies established in 1979
Organisations based in Gazipur